Go Topless Day (variously known as National Go Topless Day, International Go Topless Day) is an annual event held in the United States to support the right of women to go topless in public on gender-equality grounds. In states where women have that right topfreedom laws are celebrated, and protests are held in states where topless women are prohibited.

Organizer
The annual event was started in 2007 by Go Topless, a Nevada group formed by Claude Vorilhon, leader of the Raelian Movement, a UFO religion. GoTopless has supported events and chapters in other countries.

History 
Go Topless Day was founded in response to the arrest of Phoenix Feeley (Jill Coccaro), a topless activist who was arrested for being topless in public in New York in 2005. The city of New York settled with Feeley for $29,000 because toplessness is legal there.

Go Topless Day is scheduled for the Sunday nearest August 26, Women's Equality Day, since on that day in 1920 women's suffrage was approved (in 1971 the U.S. Congress declared the day to be Women's Equality Day). The event encourages women to go topless in public, and men to cover their chests by wearing brassieres or bikinis.

Events
In 2008, the first Go Topless Day was organized.

In 2009, National Go Topless Day was celebrated on August 23 in the United States.

In 2011, Go Topless Day in the US was held on August 24. Protesters, both men and women, participated in rallies held in twelve U.S. states, including California, New York and North Carolina. Women who participated in the celebration used either fake latex nipples or pasties to cover their nipples and avoid arrest due to laws in some states that prohibit women from showing their areola and nipples in public. The protesters displayed signs that read "Men and women have nipples. Why should women hide theirs?" and "Equal topless rights for all or none". Many men who joined the demonstration wore bras and bikinis to protest against the double standard where men are allowed to go bare chested, but women are prohibited to go topless in public.

In 2011, Go Topless Day was celebrated for the first time in Canada. The 2011 Canadian Go Topless Day rally was held in Toronto, Ontario, on August 28. Nearly twenty women went topless going from Queen Street East to Kew Beach on a pick-up truck sounding loudly the song "Revolution" by The Beatles. According to Diane Brisbois, the spokesperson for Go Topless Canada, "This is not a beauty contest. It is about freedom. We have support; there are many men who come to our events too."

In 1996, the Ontario Court of Appeal overturned the 1991 conviction of Gwen Jacob, saying "there was nothing degrading or dehumanizing" about baring her breasts in public. The decision established  the right of women in Canada to go topless in public.

In 2011, topless women congregated in Bryant Park in New York City on Go Topless Day, while men mostly observed, 30 cities held demonstrations in the US.

In 2013, Go Topless Day in the US was held on August 25 and marked the 6th anniversary of the event. There were demonstrations in 40 cities. Men who support the group's mission were asked to cover their nipples with pasties or bras.

As of 2020 there have been 13 Go Topless Days, with the event being held in the last week of August each year.

See also

References

External links
 , the event's official website

2007 establishments in Nevada
Annual events in Canada
Annual events in the United States
August observances
Breast
Civil disobedience
Gender equality
Nudity and protest
Raëlian practices
Recurring events established in 2007
Women's rights in Canada
Women's rights in the United States
Sunday observances